For the district inside the city of Stuttgart, see Hohenheim.

Schloss Hohenheim is a manor estate in Stuttgart, eponymous of the  Hohenheim city district. 
The original castle was a fief of the County of Württemberg, recorded for the 12th century. The estate fell into the possession of   Charles Eugene, Duke of Württemberg in 1768, who had it re-built as a Rococo style manor with  extensive gardens and residential palace for his future wife, Franziska von Hohenheim. The estate was the main ducal residence during 1772–1797, when it fell to the city of Stuttgart.
An Agricultural Educational Testing and Model Institution was housed here in 1818, 
and the estate remains in use by the Horticulture and Agriculture Departments 
of the University of Hohenheim.

History
The first mention of Hohenheim  is in a donation of some land to Hirsau Abbey by Egilof von Hohenheim. The castle was sold by the von Hohenheim family in 1406, and passed to the Esslingen hospital in 1432. In 1676, it was bought by Immanuel von Garb, after whom it was known as Garbenhof for some time.
As von Garb's granddaughter died without heirs in 1768, the estate fell into the possession of   Charles Eugene, Duke of Württemberg.

Charles Eugene made Hohenheim his main residence in 1772 and made major changes to the estate, turning it into a full sized Rococo manor.
The gardens around the castle were also planned at this time. They featured pillars depicting the Roman gods Jupiter (god) and a playhouse now used as a museum by the University of Hohenheim. The gardens continued to be maintained and many exotic plants were added. The Duke commissioned an extensive residential palace to be built on the grounds of Hohenheim in 1782 until construction halted in 1793 due to the Duke's death at Hohenheim.

His brother, Duke Frederick II Eugene died in Hohenheim in 1797, after which the estate land was rented out to tenants and the manor and gardens placed under the administration of the city of Stuttgart, falling into gradual decline. It was used as a military hospital in 1814.

In 1818, King Wilhelm I of Württemberg and his wife Catherine founded the Agricultural Educational Testing and Model Institution, which was housed in a separate building on the castle and the Paracelsus School was housed in the east wing much later.

A wing of the castle was destroyed during World War II. In the 1970s, the castle was restored and modernized and the rococo plaster removed. The 1990s saw the return of this plaster to lock once again.

Current use
Today, the University of Hohenheim uses large portions of the castle grounds. The Horticulture and Agriculture Departments of the University have been found on the castle grounds since 1818. The Kavaliersbau , the University of Hohenheim established a canteen in 1918 that was converted into a restaurant in 1958.

Gallery

See also
Bombast von Hohenheim

References

Bibliography

External links

 Pdf Hohenheim University for historical trail, circa October 11, 2013
 "Schloss Hohenheim" on the Stuttgart city website.
 Palace on the University of Hohenheim's website.
  University of Hohenheim historical trail pdf.
  Search for "Schloss Hohenheim" on German Digital Library.
  Search for "Schloss Hohenheim" in Portal SPK, the Prussian Cultural Heritage Foundation.
Photo gallery of the castle.

Castles in Stuttgart